State Route 131 (SR-131), was a state highway in southern Davis County, Utah, United States from 1933 to 2001.

Route description
From its western terminus it headed east on 400 North as a two-lane road to pass over the Union Pacific railway tracks before it reached a partial diamond interchange with I-15 (exit 317); the partial interchange only allows access to and from the south.

The route continued east from I-15 on 400 North as a four-lane undivided road to a junction with U.S. Route 89 (US-89, North 500 West). As it crossed US-89 it left West Bountiful and entered Bountiful. Continuing east in Bountiful the route had several side streets before it reached its western terminus at a junction with SR-106 at 200 West.

History

The original route began on the current border line between North Salt Lake and Bountiful at the intersection of what is now South Main Street (US-89) and 400 East/800 West (at approximately 3125 South). From the original southern terminus the route headed north on 400 East/800 West through the current cities of North Salt Lake, Woods Cross, and into West Bountiful to 400 North. It then headed east on 400 North to SR-1 (US-91, 500 West) in Bountiful.

Nearly 30 years later, in 1961, the routing of the section of SR-1 (US-91) that connected at both ends of SR-131 was adjusted, and the SR-1 designation was applied to the new section of I-15. At the same time, the alignment of SR-106 through Bountiful between 400 North and 2200 South was moved west from Main Street to 200 West. As part of this overall change, the northern terminus of former SR-131 was extended east to 200 West to connect with the new routing of SR-106.

In 1969, the southernmost  section of SR-131 from South Main Street (SR-106) to 2600 South was re-designated as part of SR-93. At the same time the approximately  section that ran north of 2600 South to West 400 North and then east on 400 North to I-15 (SR-1) was deleted from the state highway system.

After the change in 1969, the surviving section of the former SR-131 (400 North, between I-15 and 200 West) remained essentially unchanged for almost another 30 years. In 1997, the western terminus was extended  farther west along 400 North to ensure that the Utah Department of Transportation (UDOT) had the responsibility of maintaining the "structure across the railroad that was built as part of I-15".

In 2001, the routing of SR-106 was again changed such that what remained of SR-131 was re-designated as part of SR-106, and SR-131 was deleted from the state highway system.

Major intersections

See also

Notes

References

External links

 Highway Resolutions: Route 131 (PDF)
 Route 131 on Dan Stober's Utah Highways

131
131
Streets in Utah